Ninne Pelladata may refer to:

Ninne Pelladata (1968 film), 1968 Indian comedy drama film 
Ninne Pelladata (1996 film), 1996 Indian drama film